Thomas Frank Lee  (June 8, 1862 – March 4, 1886) was a Major League Baseball pitcher. He played for Chicago White Stockings and the Baltimore Monumentals in the  season.

External links

Chicago White Stockings players
Baltimore Monumentals players
1862 births
1886 deaths
Baseball players from Milwaukee
19th-century baseball players
Memphis Reds players
Milwaukee Brewers (minor league) players
19th-century deaths from tuberculosis
Tuberculosis deaths in Wisconsin